Clan Kennedy is a Scottish clan of the Scottish Lowlands.

History

Origins of the clan

The Votadini were a tribe in Lothian and their chief, Cunedda, was sent by the British leader, Vortigern, to establish settlements in order to resist Picto-Scottish sea raids in the south west of Scotland. These settlements spread down the west coast as far as Wales. Cunedda is rendered as Cinneidgh in the Celtic language, meaning ugly or grim-headed. The name became associated with the district of Carrick, Scotland.

During the early part of the reign of William the Lion, Gilbert Mac Kenedi witnessed a charter to Melrose Abbey granting lands in Carrick. During the reign of Alexander II of Scotland Gillespie Kennedy is named in charters as the senechal of Carrick.

Wars of Scottish Independence

Kennedys supported Robert the Bruce during the Wars of Scottish Independence. Kennedys inherited the Earldom of Carrick from the line of Sir John Kennedy of Dunure's wife, Mary de Carrick, who descended from Sir Gilbert De Carrick.  In 1372, Robert II of Scotland rewarded John Kennedy of Dunure as chief of his name and baillie of Carrick.

15th and 16th centuries
 

In about 1457 John's direct descendant, Gillbert, was created Lord Kennedy. He was also a regent to the infant James III of Scotland. James Kennedy, brother of the first Lord Kennedy, was one of Scotland's best loved bishops. James served briefly as High Chancellor of Scotland and was also Bishop of Dunkeld, and also later Archbishop of St Andrews. In 1455 he founded St Salvator's College.

Hugh Kennedy of Ardstinchar was a Scots mercenary who fought at the Siege of Orléans for Joan of Arc. As a result, Joan figures on the arms of Kennedy of Bargany.

In 1509, Sir David Kennedy, the third Lord Kennedy was created Earl of Cassillis. He was killed at the Battle of Flodden in 1513. The second Earl of Cassillis was murdered in 1527. Gillbert Kennedy, the third Earl, was one of four Scottish commissioners who were poisoned on their return from the marriage of Mary, Queen of Scots to the Dauphin of France in 1558. The third Earl had inherited his title at the age of twelve and one of his first acts was to sign the death warrant of Patrick Hamilton, the first Scottish Protestant martyr.

The Moray Kennedys were a branch of the clan who travelled north with the sister of the third Lord Kennedy, Janet Kennedy who had a son by James IV of Scotland, as part of the possession of the earldom of Moray. The Moray Kennedys became a sept of the Clan Cameron.

17th century and Civil War

In 1601 the Kennedy Earls of Cassilis were involved in a feud against their relations, the Kennedy Lairds of Bargany. The Earls of Cassillis were supported by the Clan Fergusson and the Laird of Bargany was killed.

From 1649 to 1651, John Kennedy, 6th Earl of Cassilis was Lord Justice General of Scotland and a zealous Protestant. He and his son, the seventh Earl, were both firm supporters of Parliament during the Civil War. The Justice General also sat in Oliver Cromwell's House of Lords. The Kennedys suffered for their beliefs but their estates remained largely intact.

The Kennedy of Kermuck branch of the clan were hereditary constables of Aberdeen from at least 1413. The Kennedys of Kermuck were outlawed when in 1652 the father and son of the family mortally wounded John Forbes of Watertown.

18th and 19th centuries

When the Eighth Earl of Cassillis died there was a court dispute lasting three years to determine the succession. The titles and estates of the Kennedys were claimed by William Douglas, afterwards duke of Queensberry, a great grandson in the female line of the 7th earl and also by Sir Thomas Kennedy, Bart., of Culzean, a descendant of the 3rd earl, i.e. by the heir general and the heir male. In January 1762, the House of Lords found in favour of Thomas. On 30 November 1775, Thomas died unmarried, and was succeeded by his brother David, who commissioned Robert Adam to build Culzean Castle, and died unmarried on 18 December 1792.

With David, the baronetcy became extinct. The earldom of Cassillis now passed to a cousin, Archibald Kennedy, a captain in the royal navy, whose father, Archibald Kennedy (died 1763), had migrated to America in 1722 and had become collector of customs in New York. His son, the 11th earl, had estates in New Jersey and married an American heiress; in 1765 he was said to own more houses in New York than any one else. He died in London on 30 December 1794, and was succeeded by his son Archibald (1770–1846), who was created Baron Ailsa in 1806 and marquess of Ailsa in 1831. His great-grandson Archibald (born 1847) became 3rd marquess.

Lieutenant General Sir Clark Kennedy served through the entire Peninsular War and in 1815 he commanded the centre squadron of the Royal Dragoons at the Battle of Waterloo. At Waterloo he personally captured the eagle and colours of the 105th Regiment of French Infantry. Sir Clark was from the Kennedy of Moray branch of the clan.

20th century 
The lawyer, historian, author and campaigner for the righting of legal injustice, Ludovic Kennedy was a notable member of the Kennedy clan. In his collected writings, he recalls the story of his forebear, Captain Archibald Kennedy returning from New York at the end of the 18C to Culzean Castle to assume the earldom of Cassillis

Castles

 Cassillis House, near Maybole. Seat of the chiefs.
 Culzean Castle was a former seat of the chiefs.
 Dunure Castle in South Ayrshire was the original stronghold of the chiefs.
 Dalquharran Castle in South Ayrshire once owned by the Kennedys of Kirkhill and Dunure; now a ruin
 Cruggleton Castle, Sorbie, Wigtownshire
 Dunduff Castle
 Greenan Castle in Ayr
 Maybole Castle

Base of Scottish family tree

Here is the base of the family tree: 

 John Kennedy of Dunure and Cassillis M Heiress of the Carrick Earls
 Sir Gilbert
 James M Princess Mary (2nd daughter of Robert III)
 Gilbert (Became Lord Kennedy in about 1457)
 .x James Kennedy (He served as High Chancellor of Scotland and was Bishop of Dunkeld, and later Archbishop of St Andrews. At St Andrews he founded St. Salvator's College in 1455 and is one of the founders of the University of St Andrews)
 Hugh Kennedy of Ardstinchar (Part of the Great Army of Scotland during the Hundred Years War and fought at the Battle of Bauge, and with Joan of Arc at the Siege of Orleans)
 Sir David (Third lord of Kennedy, created Earl of Cassilis in 1509)

Scottish chief
 The Most Hon. David Thomas Kennedy, 9th Marquess of Ailsa, who is also Earl of Cassillis, Lord Kennedy, Baron Ailsa and Chief of the Name and Arms of Kennedy, of Ailsa.
 Arms: Scottish: Argent, a chevron Gules between three cross crosslets fichée Sable, all within a double tressure flory counterflory Gules.

References

External links
 Kennedy Society of North America
 The Kennedy Surname One-Name Study
 Kennedy Heraldry

 
Kennedy
Scottish Lowlands